At the beginning of 3rd dynasty of Ur Sirara was a temple complex in Lagash - it may also (or instead) have been a city as mentioned in The Royal Chronicle of Lagaš. It has been suggested that the city-state known as Sirara was also called Nina or Nimin which was probably a seaport.

Notes

Sumer